John Ewen Sinclair,  (December 24, 1879 – December 23, 1949) was a Canadian politician.

Born in Summerfield, Prince Edward Island, the son of Peter Sinclair, he was first elected to the House of Commons of Canada in the Prince Edward Island riding of Queen's in 1917 federal election. A Liberal, he was re-elected in 1921. He was defeated in 1925 but was re-elected in 1926. From 1921 to 1925, he was a Minister without Portfolio. In 1930, he was appointed to the Senate of Canada representing the senatorial division of Queen's, Prince Edward Island. He served until his death in 1949.

References

1879 births
1949 deaths
People from Queens County, Prince Edward Island
Canadian senators from Prince Edward Island
Laurier Liberals
Liberal Party of Canada MPs
Liberal Party of Canada senators
Members of the House of Commons of Canada from Prince Edward Island
Members of the King's Privy Council for Canada